David M. Turk is an American attorney serving as the United States deputy secretary of energy in the Biden administration.

Early life and education 
Turk was born in Quito, Ecuador and raised in Rock Falls, Illinois. Turk attended Rock Falls High School before he earned a bachelor's degree from the University of Illinois at Urbana–Champaign and a Juris Doctor from the University of Virginia School of Law in 1999.

Career 
From 2001 to 2007, Turk worked in the United States Senate offices of Joe Biden and Kent Conrad. He was also the staff director of the United States House Oversight Subcommittee on National Security. During the Obama administration, he served as an assistant to the president and senior director of the United States National Security Council. He then moved to the United States Department of State, where he worked as a deputy special envoy for climate change and helped coordinate efforts to limit the proliferation of nuclear weapons between Russia and the United States. Turk later served as Deputy Assistant Secretary of Energy for International Climate and Technology. After the end of the Obama administration, he became the deputy executive director of the International Energy Agency, where he helped promote clean energy around the world.

On February 13, 2021, his nomination by President Joe Biden to be Deputy Secretary of Energy was formally submitted to the Senate for confirmation.

The Senate Committee on Energy and Natural Resources favorably reported the nomination by a 20-0 vote, and the full United States Senate confirmed Turk by a 98-2 vote on March 24, 2021, with only Senators Josh Hawley and Rand Paul in opposition. He was sworn in on March 25, 2021 by Secretary Jennifer Granholm.

Personal life 
Turk and his wife, Emily, have three children. Emily is a sustainability expert and architect.

References

External links

Year of birth missing (living people)
Living people
Biden administration personnel
International Energy Agency officials
Obama administration personnel
People from Quito
United States Department of State officials
United States Deputy Secretaries of Energy
University of Illinois Urbana-Champaign alumni
University of Virginia School of Law alumni
People from Rock Falls, Illinois